Rajshahi Division is one of the eight first-level administrative divisions of Bangladesh. Rajshahi Division consists of 8 districts, 70 Upazilas (the next lower administrative tier) and 1,092 Unions (the lowest administrative tier).

The region has historically been dominated by various feudal Rajas, Maharajas and Zamindars. Formerly comprising 16 districts, a new division (Rangpur Division) was formed with the 8 northern districts of the old Rajshahi Division from early 2010.

Etymology and names
The Rajshahi Division is named after Rajshahi District. Dominated by various feudal Rajas, Maharajas and Zamindars of mixed origins throughout history, the name is a compound of the words Raj and Shahi, both of which can be translated into reign or kingdom. Archaic spellings in the English language also included Rajeshae. The capital city of the division was formerly known as Rampur Boalia but was later renamed to Rajshahi too, to match the name of the district.

History

Economy

Agriculture
Rajshahi is well known for its fruit, particularly for mango and lichi. Rajshahi also produces a lot of crops and vegetables like potato, carrot, rice, onion, wheat, sugarcane, pulses, spices, banana etc. Naogaon is known as the storehouse of food of Bangladesh.

Geography
Rajshahi lies in the west of Bangladesh. To its south is Khulna division, to its east is Dhaka and Mymensingh divisions, to its north is Rangpur division and to the west is West Bengal state of India.The country is entirely flat plains, with several tracts still covered by forest. The division is bordered by the Padma to its west, which forms the international border with India, and the Jamuna to the east. These rivers merge at the southeastern tip of Rajshahi division in Pabna district. Apart from these main rivers, there are numerous tributaries to these rivers such as the Atrai, Karatoya and Mahananda.

Culture

Historically Rajshahi division, being in the north-centre of the historical Bengal region, was a centre for Buddhist learning. In the early-modern period Rajshahi town was well known for silk weaving, and Rajshahi silk is still one of its most popular exports. The Varendra Research Museum in Rajshahi is the first of its kind in Bangladesh and houses numerous cultural artifacts from Bengal's ancient past.

Rajshahi division has produced contributions to Bengali literature. Rassundari Devi, the first modern autobiographer in Bengali literature, was born in Pabna, Rajshahi division in 1809.

All festivals of Bangladesh are widely celebrated here. Pohela Baisakh, Bengali New Year, Eid ul-Fitr, Eid ul-Adha, Durga Puja, are all celebrated widely.

Demographics 
At the time of the 2011 census, Rajshahi division had a population of 18,484,858. Muslims are 17,248,861 which is 93.31% of the population, while Hindus are 1,081,584 which is 5.85% of the population. Other religions (almost entirely Christianity and indigenous faiths) are only 0.24% of the population and are mainly found among the ethnic minorities.

The vast mass of people speak Bengali. The dialect of the region is similar to that in Malda and Murshidabad of West Bengal, called Varendri. It has more influence from Bihari languages. Ethnic population is 206,919 which is 1.12% of the population. This consists mainly of Munda peoples such as Santals and Mundas as well as the Dravidian Kurukh, who still speak their original languages.

Points of interest
Rajshahi is a well known tourist destination within Bangladesh, with there being many interesting landmarks.

Notable places include:
 Sompur Bihar, a large Buddhist monastery.
 Varendra Research Museum in Rajshahi is one of the foremost museums specializing in history of ancient Bengal.
 Mahasthangarh, home to archaeological sites of Hindu, Buddhist and Muslim periods.
 Puthia Temple Complex and Palaces, the palaces of old Jamidars, some Kilometers drive from Rajshahi city.
 Bagha Mosque, in Bagha thana of Rajshahi District.
 Jamuna Bridge, Sirajganj District
 Uttara Gonobhaban, palace of the famous Queen of Dighapatia, located in Natore district.
 Nabaratna Temple, Sirajganj District
 Kusumba Mosque, Naogaon.
 Sona Mosque, Chapai Nawabgonj
 Chalan Beel, the largest water body in Bangladesh, spreading in Sirajganj, Natore and Pabna districts.
 Shahzadpur Kachharibari, Sirajganj District

Districts
 Natore
 Rajshahi
 Sirajganj
 Pabna
 Bogura
 Chapainawabganj
 Naogaon
 Joypurhat

Major cities and towns
The major cities of Rajshahi division are Rajshahi, Natore, Sirajganj, Pabna, Bogra and Chapai Nawabganj.

Education 
The major educational institutes in Rajshahi are:
 University of Rajshahi (RU)
 Rajshahi University of Engineering and Technology (RUET)
 Rajshahi Medical University ( RMC)
 North Bengal International University (NBIU)
 Shah Makhdum Management University (SMMU)
 Rajshahi Medical College (RMC)
 EXIM Bank Agriculture University
 Bangladesh Army University of Engineering & Technology    
 Rajshahi Science & Technology University    
 Shaheed Ziaur Rahman Medical College, Bogra
 Joypurhat Girls Cadet College, Joypurhat
 Rajshahi College
 Rajshahi Govt. City College, Rajshahi 
 New Govt. Degree College, Rajshahi
 Rajshahi Cadet College
 Azizul Haque College, Bogra
 Bogra Zilla school
 Pabna Zilla school
 Pabna Cadet College
 Pabna Textile Engineering College
 Govt. Edward College, Pabna
 Pabna University of Science and Technology
 Pabna Medical College, Pabna
 Joypurhat Government College
 Shaheed M. Monsur Ali Medical College, Sirajganj
 Sirajgonj polytechnic Institute, Sirajganj
 Belkuchi Govt. College, Sirajganj
 G S K L High School, Belkuchi, Sirajgonj
 Seroil Government High School, Rajshahi (SGHS),Rajshahi 
 Government Laboratory High School Rajshahi 
 Rajshahi Collegiate School (RCS), Rajshahi
 Naogaon K.D. Government High School,Naogaon

The University of Rajshahi (established 1953) is the second largest university of Bangladesh with around 50 disciplines and 6 institutes. Rajshahi Collegiate School (established in 1828) is one of the oldest school in the country and Indian sub-continent which became again the best school in Bangladesh in 2018.

Notable residents
 Montazur Rahman Akbar, film-maker, grew up in Akkelpur.
 Group Captain (Rtd.) Saiful Azam, fighter pilot, was Member of Parliament (MP) for Pabna-3 from 1991 to 1996. 
 Manzoor Alam Beg, photographer, was born in Rajshahi district in 1931.
 Abdul Hamid Khan Bhashani 
 Apu Biswas
 Mohammad Ali Bogra
 General Jayanto Nath Chaudhuri OBE, former Chief of Army Staff of the Indian Army.
 Pramatha Chaudhuri, writer
 Samson H. Chowdhury
 Zahid Hasan
 Amjad Hossain (Member of National Assembly of Pakistan), organiser of Liberation War of Bangladesh in 1971.
 A. B. Mirza Azizul Islam
 Taijul Islam
 Abdul Jalil
 James
 Air Vice Marshal (Rtd.) A. K. Khandker, first Chief of Staff of Bangladesh Air Force (1971–1975), Former Minister, Ministry Planning of People's Republic of Bangladesh
 Mahiya Mahi
 Amiya Bhushan Majumdar, Indian novelist
 Partha Pratim Majumder
 Bande Ali Mia, poet
 Bidya Sinha Saha Mim
 Mohammed Fazle Rabbee, cardiologist, intellectual, murdered in the intellectual killing during the 24 Dec 1971 genocide in Bangladesh
 Mushfiqur Rahim
 Arifur Rahman
 Engineer Habibur Rahman Professional IT Expert, Belkuchi, Sirajgonj
 Tarique Rahman
 Ziaur Rahman
 Khaleda Zia

References

External links

 E-Rajshahi, An online portal for information and government services managed by Rajshahi City Corporation

 
Divisions of Bangladesh
Northern Bengal
Divisions of British India